Kamil Mishara (born 24 April 2001) is a Sri Lankan cricketer. He made his international debut for the Sri Lanka cricket team in February 2022. During the year 2019, dynamic and talented Kamil Mishara named and awarded as School boy cricketer of the year. He became the fourth Royal College student to win this title.  Sri Lanka youth cap and Royal College left-handed opening batsman Kamil made the highest individual score of the school cricket season 2019 when he thumped a career best 250 off 270 balls (32 fours, 5 sixes) against Ananda College in their Singer Trophy Under 19 match played during the year 2019.

Career
He made his Twenty20 debut for Nondescripts Cricket Club in the 2018–19 SLC Twenty20 Tournament on 19 February 2019. In January 2020, he was named in Sri Lanka's squad for the 2020 Under-19 Cricket World Cup. He made his List A debut on 24 March 2021, for Nondescripts Cricket Club in the 2020–21 Major Clubs Limited Over Tournament.

In August 2021, he was named in the SLC Greens team for the 2021 SLC Invitational T20 League tournament. In November 2021, he was selected to play for the Kandy Warriors following the players' draft for the 2021 Lanka Premier League. Later the same month, he was named in Sri Lanka's Test squad for their series against the West Indies. In January 2022, he was named in Sri Lanka's Twenty20 International (T20I) squad for their series against Australia. He made his T20I debut on 20 February 2022, for Sri Lanka against Australia.

In April 2022, he was named in Sri Lanka's Test squad for their series against Bangladesh.

References

External links
 

2001 births
Living people
Sri Lankan cricketers
Sri Lanka Twenty20 International cricketers
Nondescripts Cricket Club cricketers
Place of birth missing (living people)